Alexander Osipovich Drankov (18 January 1886 – 3 January 1949) was a Russian Empire and Soviet photographer, cameraman, film producer, and one of the pioneers of the Russian pre-revolutionary cinematography.

Early years
The exact date of birth and birthplace of Alexander (originally Abram) Drankov are unknown. According to some accounts, he was born in southern parts of Russia in 1886. His brother Lev, who also became a cinematographer, was born in 1880 in Elisavetgrad. In the early 20th century, Drankov owned a dancing school in Sevastopol, which fed all of his family. Later on, he took interest in photography and soon became a professional in this craft. Drankov moved to Saint Petersburg, where he would earn fame for his photographic talent and be awarded the title of the Purveyor of the Royal Court of His Imperial Highness for his quality photographs of Nicholas II. Also, Drankov managed to make photographic work much cheaper and open a chain of no less than 50 studios, where they took photos under amplified electric lighting, thus reducing the cost of the whole photographing process. Subsequently, Drankov became a press photographer for The Times and Parisian L'Illustration and obtained a journalist accreditation at the State Duma.

Film industry career
In 1907, Alexander Drankov decided to start his own film-making business and opened "A. Drankov's Atelier", which would soon transform into a joint-stock company "A. Drankov & Co". Drankov and his team began to shoot newsreels, him and his cameramen being habitual frequenters of every major event in both Saint Petersburg and Moscow until the October Revolution of 1917. Also, he started shooting feature shorts, such as Boris Godunov. This motion picture was never finished, though some of the materials shot for this movie were shown at cinemas in that same 1907 under the title Scenes from a Boyar Life. Drankov’s first ever filming of Leo Tolstoy (1908) was a sensational success. After having failed to obtain the writer’s permission to film him, Drankov hid himself with a camera in a wooden outhouse in the garden of Tolstoy’s estate and shot the promenading writer through a small ornamental window.

The first motion picture produced by Drankov and released into movie theaters was a film called Stenka Razin. The first performance took place on October 15 (28) of 1908. For the first time in Russia, the movie was accompanied by the original sound (movie theaters would acquire the film together with the phonograph recording of music). The music score was written by a Russian composer Mikhail Ippolitov-Ivanov for the eponymous play by Vasily Goncharov to be staged at the "Aquarium Theater". The release of this film was also the first case of copyright infringement by a filmmaker in Russian history (Drankov never signed a formal contract with the screenplay writer and the composer).

Alexander Drankov’s next film was the first Russian comedy called Userdniy denshchik (Усердный денщик; 1908). At the same time, Drankov came up with a new type of movie advertising by publishing postcards with snapshots from his movies and also placing them on posters, which had never been done before. In 1908 he also directed The Big Man, The Marriage of Krechinsky and produced The Diligent Batman. In 1909 he directed film Taras Bulba, based on the novel by Nikolai Gogol.

With the onset of Alexander Khanzhonkov’s activities in the movie industry, Drankov became quite unsettled. Upon making his acquaintance with Khanzhonkov and finding out about his plans to produce a film called Pesn’ pro kuptsa Kalashnikova, Drankov decided to sabotage the release of this film by making a pre-emptive release of an eponymous deliberate box office failure. When Khanzhonkov found out about Drankov’s intentions, he sped up the making of his film and then managed to release it before Drankov was able to finish his competing film. After this incident, the rivalry between Khanzhonkov and Drankov soon became one of the main intrigues of the Russian cinematographic life, occasionally leading to the release of almost identical films, e.g. Votsareniye Doma Romanovykh (1913; produced by Khanzhonkov) and Tryoksotletiye tsarstvovaniya doma Romanovykh (1913; produced by Drankov).

Alexander Drankov was the first one in Russia to start producing crime films, which had only recently come into fashion in France. His serial film called Son’ka – Zolotaya Ruchka (1914–1915) was an unprecedented success in Russia. In 1917, Drankov tried to make a market of the revolutionary events in Russia by releasing a few "revolutionary" movies, such as Georgy Gapon and Babushka russkoy revolutsii (both 1917), but after the October Revolution he decided to leave Saint Petersburg.

Later years
We know about this period of Drankov’s life from contradictory accounts of his acquaintances. He first tried to make profit by selling jewellery in Kiev, then moved to Yalta and began shooting pornographic films. In November 1920, he emigrated to Constantinople, where he made his living by either organizing cockroach racing events, according to one account, or by film distribution and maintaining an amusement park, according to another account. In 1922, Drankov moved to the United States of America, where he would buy a mobile cinema projector and show films to Russian immigrants. In 1927, he made an attempt to return to film-making business, but his intention to shoot a major film about a love affair between Nicholas II and ballerina Mathilde Kschessinska turned out to be a failure. After his unsuccessful attempt to gain a foothold in Hollywood, Alexander Drankov opened a café in Venice, California, but soon moved to San Francisco, where he would work in his own photo company until his death on 3 January 1949 in San Francisco. He is buried in Colma, California.

References

External links

 
 

Cinematographers from the Russian Empire
Film producers from the Russian Empire
Photographers from the Russian Empire
Soviet photographers
1886 births
1949 deaths
Jews from the Russian Empire
Soviet Jews
Articles containing video clips